Saint-Benoît-Labre is a municipality in the Municipalité régionale de comté de Beauce-Sartigan in Quebec, Canada. It is part of the Chaudière-Appalaches region and the population is 1,630 as of 2009. It is named after Benedict Joseph Labre.

In 2001 a group of Cistercian nuns moved from Saint-Romuald, Quebec to a newly constructed abbey in Saint-Benoît-Labre, where they make chocolate.

The territory of Saint-Benoît-Labre surrounds the village of Lac-Poulin.

References

Commission de toponymie du Québec
Ministère des Affaires municipales, des Régions et de l'Occupation du territoire

Municipalities in Quebec
Incorporated places in Chaudière-Appalaches
Canada geography articles needing translation from French Wikipedia